The Magnificent is the first studio album by DJ Jazzy Jeff. It was released via BBE and Rapster Records on September 12, 2002.

Critical reception
At Metacritic, which assigns a weighted average score out of 100 to reviews from mainstream critics, The Magnificent received an average score of 75% based on 11 reviews, indicating "generally favorable reviews".

In 2004, Philadelphia Weekly placed it at number 25 on the "100 Best Philly Albums of All Time" list.

Track listing

Charts

References

External links
 

2002 albums
DJ Jazzy Jeff albums
Barely Breaking Even albums